Mark Levinson is an American high-end audio equipment brand established in 1972 by eponymous founder Mark Levinson, and based in Stamford, Connecticut. It is owned by Harman International Industries, a subsidiary of Samsung Electronics.

History 
Mark Levinson Audio Systems Ltd. (MLAS) was founded 1972 in Woodbridge, Connecticut (a suburb of New Haven) by Mark Levinson. Original MLAS products were designed by John Curl (Hence the JC abbreviation to many of the early products) under the supervision of Mark Levinson, with a team of associates. Audio pioneer Dick Burwen, Levinson’s first electronics mentor, helped Levinson start the company with the iconic LNP-2 Preamplifier. Chief engineer Tom Colangelo, who brought visionary audio circuitry to the company, died in a tragic car accident in 2007.

By 1980 MLAS was in serious financial trouble. Levinson then asked Sandy Berlin, a retired executive in the audio industry, to invest in MLAS and to aid in the management of the company, which Berlin did, personally investing $480,000 in the company and persuading several others to invest an additional $300,000. At Berlin's request, Levinson entered into an Employment Agreement with MLAS from December 1980, under which Levinson agreed to convey to MLAS the permanent and exclusive right, title and interest to the trade name "Mark Levinson". He also agreed that, should he leave MLAS' employ, he would not engage in the audio business "anywhere in the world".

In October 1984, three creditors forced MLAS into bankruptcy and Mark Levinson Audio Systems, Ltd. ceased to exist, with Madrigal Audio Labs acquiring "all of [MLAS'] equipment, inventory, parts, finished and semi-finished goods, office furniture, blueprints and trademark and tradename rights including those arising under agreement between Mark Levinson and MLAS. 

Since 1990, the Mark Levinson brand and trade name have been property of Harman International Industries. Mark Levinson produces audio amplifiers and digital audio processors that have a characteristic black anodized chassis, a design associated with the brand since the beginning. Harman also makes Mark Levinson audio systems as an optional upgrade for Lexus luxury automobiles. Harman's Mark Levinson automotive audio systems are designed in collaboration with sound, electrical, and design engineers who produce Mark Levinson audio electronics.

Certain Lexus models have featured Mark Levinson sound systems as an option since 2001, with prices varying based on the vehicle and its specific components (~US$2,500 for the LS 460, ~US$1,600 for the ES 350, ~US$1,440 for the IS 350, etc.). The first Mark Levinson car 5.1 surround sound system appeared on the Toyota Crown Majesta in 2004. Current UK Lexus models available with the Mark Levinson Audio System include: CT 200h Premier, IS 250/300h Premier, GS 300h/450h Premier, RC F Carbon, NX 300h Premier, RX 450h Advance and Premier, LS 460 Luxury and F Sport and LS 600h L Premier.

Equipment history

Amplifiers 
 ML-2 Class A Mono Amplifier with regulated power supplies
 ML-3 Power Amplifier
 ML-9 Power Amplifier
 ML-11 Power Amplifier

Preamplifiers 
 LNP-1 Preamplifier
 LNP-2 Professional Preamplifier
 JC-1 Moving Coil Cartridge Preamplifier
 JC-1AC Moving Coil Cartridge Preamplifier
 JC-2 Straightline Preamplifier
 ML-1 Preamplifier
 ML-6, ML-6A, ML-6B Preamplifier
 ML-7, ML-7A Preamplifier
 ML-8 Microphone Preamplifier
 ML-10, ML-10A Preamplifier
 ML-12, ML-12A Preamplifier

Power Supplies 
 PLS-150 
 PLS-151 
 PLS-153
 PLS-154 
 ML-6

Crossovers 
 LNC-2 Electronic Crossover

Tape Machines 
 ML-5 modified Studer A-80 professional tape recorder with custom electronics

System 
 Mark Levinson HQD System
This was Levinson’s tri-amped active replay system. Each of the two channels comprising a woofer using a 24” Hartley drive unit, a pair of stacked Quad electrostatic speakers for the midrange and between the two Quad speakers a Decca (Kelly) ribbon tweeter for the treble, the latter modified by having the horn removed. Each speaker was driven by a separate ML-2 amplifier fed by a LNC-2, this in turn being fed by an ML-1 preamp.

References

External links 

 Mark Levinson Audio Systems Ltd. vintage audio gear
 
 Music Man - A Brief Biography of Mark Levinson by Barry Willis

Audio amplifier manufacturers
Audio equipment manufacturers of the United States
Auto parts suppliers of the United States
Harman International
Electronics companies established in 1972
In-car entertainment
Manufacturing companies based in Connecticut
1972 establishments in Connecticut
Companies based in Stamford, Connecticut